Buchach Raion was a raion of Ternopil Oblast in western Ukraine. Its administrative center was the city of Buchach. The raion was abolished on 18 July 2020 as part of the administrative reform of Ukraine, which reduced the number of raions of Ternopil Oblast to three. The area of Buchach Raion was merged into Chortkiv Raion. The last estimate of the raion population was

Subdivisions
At the time of disestablishment, the raion consisted of three hromadas:
 Buchach urban hromada with the administration in Buchach;
 Trybukhivtsi rural hromada with the administration in the selo of Trybukhivtsi;
 Zolotyi Potik settlementl hromada with the administration in the urban-type settlement of Zolotyi Potik.

Settlemetts

Town
 Buchach

Urban-type settlement
 Zolotyi Potik

Villages

Present
 Barysh, Beremiany, Biliavyntsi, Bobulyntsi, Brovari, Dobropole, Duliby, Hubyn, Kosmyryn, Kostil'nyky, Kurdybanivka, Kydaniv, Lishchantsi, Martynivka, Mateushivka, Medvedivtsi, Mykolayivka, Mlynky, Naberezhne, Novi Petlykivtsi, Novosilka, Novostavtsi, Ozeriany, Osivtsi, Peredmistia, Perevoloka, Pidzamochok, Pyliava, Pyshkivtsi,  Pidlissia, Pozhezha, Rukomysh, Rusyliv, Stari Petlykivtsi, Trybukhivtsi, Tsvitova, Verbiatyn, Vozyliv, Yazlovets, Zalishchyky, Zaryvyntsi, Zelena, Zhnyborody, Zhyznomyr, Zubrets, Zvenyhorod.

Former
 Kaduby, Nahirianka

People
 Ihor Kostenko, (31 December 1991 – 20 February 2014) — a Ukrainian journalist, student and activist killed during the Euromaidan events.
 Solomiya Krushelnytska (23 September 1872 – 16 November 1952) — one of the brightest soprano opera stars of the first half of the 20th century
 Maryan Krushelnytskyi — a Ukrainian actor 
 Bohdan Andrew Futey — a retired attorney and judge who served with the United States Court of Federal Claims from 1987 to 2002.
 Jan Samuel Chrzanowski — a Polish officer known for his command during the Battle of Trembowla
 Kornel Ujejski — a Polish poet, patriot and political writer of the Austrian Empire and Austria-Hungary.
 Antoni Prochaska — a Polish historian.

Books
About Buchach district Shevchenko Scientific Society 1972 published a book «The city of Buchach and its Region».

See also
 Subdivisions of Ukraine

References

External links

Former raions of Ternopil Oblast
1940 establishments in the Soviet Union
Ukrainian raions abolished during the 2020 administrative reform